Discoderoides is a genus of beetles in the family Buprestidae, containing the following species:

 Discoderoides abessynicus (Obenberger, 1931)
 Discoderoides africanus (Kerremans, 1907)
 Discoderoides alluaudi (Kerremans, 1914)
 Discoderoides cordae (Obenberger, 1922)
 Discoderoides derutus (Fahraeus, 1851)
 Discoderoides grewiae Thery, 1938
 Discoderoides helferi (Obenberger, 1922)
 Discoderoides immunitus (Fahraeus, 1851)
 Discoderoides kerremansi Bellamy, 1986
 Discoderoides macarthuri (Thery, 1941)
 Discoderoides priesneri Thery, 1936
 Discoderoides pygmaeus Bellamy, 1987
 Discoderoides theryi Bellamy, 1986

References

Buprestidae genera